Sébastien Rémy (born 16 April 1974) is a former Luxembourgian footballer, playing on the left side of midfield.

He played for the Luxembourgian national team, and domestically for F91 Dudelange in the National Division.

Club career
He started his career at Fola Esch but made his premier division debut for Sporting Mertzig in the 1998/1999 season. He moved to Dudelange in 2001.

International career
Rémy made his debut for Luxembourg in an August 2002 friendly match against Morocco. As of 1 December 2008, he had earned 51 caps, scoring no goals. He played in 12 FIFA World Cup qualification matches.

Honours
Luxembourg National Division: 5
 2002, 2005, 2006, 2007, 2008

Luxembourg Cup: 3
 2004, 2006, 2007

References

External links
 

1974 births
Living people
Luxembourgian footballers
F91 Dudelange players
Luxembourg international footballers
Association football midfielders